Spurgeon is an unincorporated community in Newton County, in the U.S. state of Missouri. The community is on Missouri Route NN approximately seven miles northwest of Neosho.

History
Spurgeon had its start ca. 1880 as a mining community, and named after the local Spurgeon family. A post office called Spurgeon was established in 1884, and remained in operation until 1912.

References

Unincorporated communities in Newton County, Missouri
Unincorporated communities in Missouri